James Thomas Grear (born June 5, 1962) is an American gospel musician. He started his music career, in 1998, with Company that are based out of Minneapolis, Minnesota. He has released eight albums, with three of them charting on the Billboard magazine Gospel Albums chart. He has released albums with a few labels, such as the following: Born Again Records,  Diamante Records, Liquid 8 Records, Alliant Music Group, Habakkuk Music, Echo Park Records.

Early life
Grear was born James Thomas Grear, in Gary, Indiana on June 5, 1962, and was raised as a member of The Church of God in Christ by his parents.

Music career
His music recording career began in 1998, and he has released eight albums with a myriad of labels, which are the following: Born Again Records,  Diamante Records, Liquid 8 Records, Alliant Music Group, Habakkuk Music, Echo Park Records. He had three albums place on the Billboard magazine Gospel Albums chart, with one placing on the R&B Albums chart. The three that charted on the Gospel Albums chart were 1998's Don't Give Up at No. 8, 2001's What Will Your Life Say at No. 14, and A Special Place in 2004 at No. 18. The album Don't Give Up, also charted on the R&B Albums chart at No. 34. He released, It's My Season, on May 5, 2015 by Universal Records alongside EchoPark JDI Records.

Discography

References

External links
 Official facebook
 James Grear Cross Rhythms Artist Profile

1962 births
Living people
African-American songwriters
African-American Christians
Musicians from Gary, Indiana
Musicians from Minneapolis
Songwriters from Indiana
Songwriters from Minnesota
21st-century African-American people
20th-century African-American people